Koog aan de Zaan (until 2016 Koog Bloemwijk) is a railway station in Koog aan de Zaan, Netherlands. Koog aan de Zaan was opened on 1 November 1869, on the Den Helder–Amsterdam railway between Zaandam and Uitgeest. The station had a rectangular station building from 1956 to 1986.

Train services
The following train services call at Koog aan de Zaan:
2x per hour local service (sprinter) Uitgeest - Zaandam - Amsterdam - Woerden - Rotterdam (all day, every day)
2x per hour local service (sprinter) Uitgeest - Zaandam - Amsterdam - Utrecht - Rhenen (only on weekdays until 8:00PM)

Bus services
64 (Zaandam - Zaandijk Rooswijk)

External links
NS website 
Dutch Public Transport journey planner 

Railway stations in North Holland
Railway stations opened in 1869
Railway stations on the Staatslijn K
1869 establishments in the Netherlands
Railway stations in the Netherlands opened in the 19th century